Sveti Lovrenc is a village in the Municipality of Prebold in east-central Slovenia. The area is part of the traditional region of Styria. The municipality is now included in the Savinja Statistical Region.

Name
The name of the settlement was changed from Sveti Lovrenc pri Preboldu (literally, 'Saint Lawrence near Prebold') to Gorenja Vas pri Preboldu (literally, 'upper village near Prebold') in 1955. The name was changed on the basis of the 1948 Law on Names of Settlements and Designations of Squares, Streets, and Buildings as part of efforts by Slovenia's postwar communist government to remove religious elements from toponyms. The name Sveti Lovrenc was restored in 1991.

Name
The local church, from which the village gets its name, is dedicated to Saint Lawrence and belongs to the Parish of Prebold. It was first mentioned in written documents dating to 1247. It was restyled in the 19th century, but the nave is still the original Romanesque structure.

References

External links
Sveti Lovrenc at Geopedia

Populated places in the Municipality of Prebold